Mirko Bonné (born 9 June 1965) is a German writer and translator.

Bonné was born in Tegernsee, Bavaria. In 1975 his family moved to Hamburg, where he attended the Hansa Gymnasium. He graduated from the Otto Hahn Gymnasium in Geesthacht in 1986 and worked as a bookshop assistant, taxi driver and nurse. His writing career began in the early 1990s with journalism, moving on to lyric poetry and translations.

In his poetry, influenced by Keats, Trakl and Eich, he treats the themes of landscape, life, and memory, while his prose, which includes novels about Shackleton and Camus, concerns itself with the mechanisms of oppression. He has published travel writing about South America, Russia, China, the United States, Iran, and Antarctica, and translated Anderson, Dickinson, Keats, Cummings, Creeley, Yeats, and Gherasim Luca. He is a member of PEN Germany and lives in Hamburg.

Original works 
 Roberta von Ampel. Radio play, Radio Bremen 1992
 Langrenus. Gedichte. Rospo, Hamburg 1994, .
 Gelenkiges Geschöpf. Poems. Rospo, Hamburg 1996, .
 Der junge Fordt. Novel. DuMont, Köln 1999, .
 Ein langsamer Sturz. Novel. DuMont, Köln 2002, .
 Hibiskus Code. Poems. DuMont, Köln 2003, .
 Der eiskalte Himmel. Novel. Schöffling, Frankfurt am Main 2006, .
 Die Republik der Silberfische. Poems. Schöffling, Frankfurt am Main 2008, .
 Wie wir verschwinden. Novel. Schöffling, Frankfurt am Main 2009, .
 Ausflug mit dem Zerberus. Schöffling, Frankfurt am Main 2010, .
 Der Eichelhäher. Short story. Literatur-Quickie, Hamburg 2010, .

Translations 
 John Keats: Werke und Briefe. Phillip Reclam jun., Stuttgart 1995.
 E. E. Cummings: 39 Alphabetisch. Gedichte. Urs Engeler Editor, Weil am Rhein 2001.
 Terry McDonagh: Kiltimagh. Ausgewählte Gedichte. Blaupause Books, Hamburg 2001.
 Ghérasim Luca: Das Körperecho. Gedichte. Urs Engeler Editor, Weil am Rhein 2004.
 William Butler Yeats: Die Gedichte (mit M. Beyer, G. Falkner, N. Hummelt (Hrsg.), C. Schuenke). Luchterhand, München 2005.
 Samuel Beckett: Six Poèmes / Sechs Gedichte. Wolfenbütteler Übersetzergespräche, Wolfenbüttel 2006.
 Robert Creeley: Alles, was es für immer bedeutet. Gedichte. Jung und Jung, Salzburg und Wien 2006.
 Rutger Kopland: Dank sei den Dingen. Ausgewählte Gedichte 1966 – 2006 (mit Hendrik Rost), Carl Hanser, München 2008.
 Emma Lew: Nesselgesang. Gedichte. Yedermann, München 2008.
 Sherwood Anderson: Winesburg, Ohio. Schöffling & Co., Frankfurt am Main 2012, .

Essays in literary journals 
 Dunkle Deutung des Vogelflugs. Essay. Bella triste No. 24, 2009.
 Das verwundete Herz. Essay. Quart Heft für Kultur Tirol No. 18, 2011.

Prizes 
 2001 Wolfgang-Weyrauch-Förderpreis for the „Literarischer März“ competition
 2002 Ernst-Willner-Preis at Klagenfurt
 2004 Berliner Kunstpreis Förderpreis
 2007  award
 2008 Prix Relay du Roman d'Evasion
 2008 Ernst-Meister-Preis für Lyrik Förderpreis
 2010 Marie-Luise-Kaschnitz-Preis
 2010 Writer in Residence Rio de Janeiro
 2012 Writer in Residence Shanghai
 2014 Rainer-Malkowski-Preis

References

External links 

 Official website
 Fortlaufende Textveröffentlichungen von Mirko Bonné im Literaturportal „Der goldene Fisch“
 Mirko Bonné: Eindrücke von einem lange aufgeschobenen Besuch im „westfälischen Idaho“
 Kontroverse Statements nach Bonnés Lesung bei den 26. Tagen der deutschsprachigen Literatur in Klagenfurt
 
 Mirko Bonné im Poetenladen
 Mirko Bonné im Gespräch über die Handlungsorte in seinem Werk

1965 births
Living people
German translators
People from Miesbach (district)
People from Herzogtum Lauenburg
English–German translators
German male non-fiction writers